Acanthocercus branchi is a species of lizard in the family Agamidae. It is a small lizard found in Zambia.

References

Acanthocercus
Reptiles described in 2012
Reptiles of Zambia
Taxa named by Philipp Wagner
Taxa named by Eli Greenbaum
Taxa named by Aaron M. Bauer